Emperor is a science fiction novel by British writer Stephen Baxter, the first in his alternate history series Time's Tapestry.

Synopsis

A mysterious prophecy from the future shapes the destiny of a family through four centuries of the Roman occupation of Britain. The story begins in 4 BC and incorporates such later events as the building of Hadrian's Wall and an attempted assassination of Constantine I. It ends in AD 418.

See also 

Conqueror
Navigator
Weaver

External links 

2006 British novels
British alternative history novels
British science fiction novels
Novels by Stephen Baxter
2006 science fiction novels
Novels set in Roman Britain
Victor Gollancz Ltd books